is a Japanese volleyball player. He competed in the men's tournament at the 1976 Summer Olympics.

References

1952 births
Living people
Japanese men's volleyball players
Olympic volleyball players of Japan
Volleyball players at the 1976 Summer Olympics
People from Minamiashigara, Kanagawa
Asian Games medalists in volleyball
Asian Games gold medalists for Japan
Volleyball players at the 1974 Asian Games
Medalists at the 1974 Asian Games